{{DISPLAYTITLE:C19H28O}}
The molecular formula C19H28O may refer to:

 Androstenone, or 5α-androst-16-en-3-one
 5α-Androst-2-ene-17-one
 Androstadienol (5,16-androstadien-3β-ol)
 4,16-Androstadien-3β-ol

Molecular formulas